Christopher Bradley Owens (born 7 September 1961) is a Canadian actor. He is best known for his performances on the television series The X-Files.

Owens was born in Toronto, Ontario, the son of Jeannette, a jazz singer, and Garry Owens, a jazz drummer.

Career
Owens has performed in many feature films, often in minor roles, including appearances in Cocktail and The Recruit. However, he is best known for his performances on the television series The X-Files. Owens initially guest starred as the younger version of William B. Davis's character, the Cigarette Smoking Man, in a 1996 episode "Musings of a Cigarette Smoking Man". He returned in 1997 in the same role in an episode called "Demons". Later that year, he played the Frankenstein-esque Great Mutato in a surreal episode called "The Post-Modern Prometheus".

In 1998, Owens was cast as special agent Jeffrey Spender, son of The Smoking Man and alien abductee Cassandra Spender. Owens was credited as 'Also Starring' but only appeared in eight episodes, spread across the show's fifth and sixth seasons, before his character died at the hand of his father. Owens returned in a 2002 episode called "William", playing a hideously disfigured Jeffrey Spender who had survived the "murder". He appeared a few episodes later in "The Truth", the series finale.

He has been nominated for numerous awards, including a 2002 Genie Award for Best Performance by an Actor in a Leading Role for The Uncles.

Filmography

Film

Television

References

External links

1961 births
Living people
Canadian male film actors
Canadian male television actors
Male actors from Toronto
Canadian people of Welsh descent